Eutomostethus ephippium is a species of common sawfly in the family Tenthredinidae.

Subspecies
These two subspecies belong to the species Eutomostethus ephippium:
 Eutomostethus ephippium ephippium (Panzer, 1798) g
 Eutomostethus ephippium vopiscus (Konow, 1899) g
Data sources: g = GBIF,

Ecology
Eutomostethus ephippium has been recorded on various grasses including species of Poa.

References

Further reading

External links

 

Tenthredinidae
Insects described in 1798